The Initiative for Policy Dialogue (IPD) is a non-profit organization based at Columbia University in the United States.

IPD was founded in July 2000 by Joseph E. Stiglitz,  with support of the Ford, Rockefeller, McArthur, and Mott Foundations and the Canadian and Swedish government, to enhance democratic processes for decision making in developing countries, to ensure that a broader range of alternative are on the table and more stakeholders are at the table.

The organization is a global network of more than 250 leading economists, political scientists, civil society representatives, and practitioners from all over the world with diverse backgrounds and views. IPD intends to help countries find solutions to pressing problems, and strengthen their institutions and civil societies.

Description
IPD helps developing countries explore the full range of economic solutions and move beyond the narrow range of policy alternatives currently at the center of international debate. The organization's approach is based on the recognition that all economic policies entail trade-offs that benefit some groups more than others, and there is no one set of policies that is best for all countries. IPD analyzes the trade-offs associated with different policies and provides governments and civil society with a framework for analysis. The programs improve the information available to the policy community, but leave the final decisions to the country's political process.

IPD emphasizes diverse participation and broad civic involvement in economic policymaking, and facilitates a more democratic discussion of development around the world. The organization's accessibly written publications, research, and public conferences enable more stakeholders to participate effectively in policy debates. IPD encourage public participation and improved access to information by webcasting many of their conferences, inviting civil society and local media, and training journalists in economics reporting. The programs facilitate the exchange of ideas, resulting in more informed dialogue and, they hope, improved economic policymaking.

IPD’s primary vehicles for outreach and collaboration are its task force, country dialogue, and journalism training programs.

Task forces
IPD task forces convene experts to study and write policy-oriented publications on complex, controversial economic issues such as transparency, governance, poverty, and environmental economics. IPD has launched over 20 task forces to date. The task forces are in the process of publishing overview chapters written for policymakers as part of a book series with Oxford University Press and Columbia University Press.

Country dialogues
IPD country dialogues allow IPD to bring its task force work directly to developing countries. Country dialogues foster an open and inclusive dialogue by convening diverse stakeholders such as senior government officials, opposition parties, NGO representatives, and academics to discuss economic policy options in the host country and improve the quality of official decision-making on economic policy issues.

Journalism training
The IPD journalism program helps strengthen journalists' economic literacy and equips them to report and write about the major economic issues confronting developing economies. With enhanced reporting and information, civil society is able to participate more effectively in the policymaking process.

IPD book series
IPD books delve deeper into alternatives for prevailing issues by examining the central issues in contention, as well as the impacts on different groups, the risks associated with each alternative, and an analysis and interpretation of the experiences of those who have tried each. These books are unique in that they are geared toward policymakers and civil society and are written as part of a collaborative process, bringing in voices from both the North and South. The books lay out policy options including the risks and trade offs inherent in each that allow for a more meaningful discourse.

Recent books
Stability with Growth 
Fair Trade for All: How Trade Can Promote Development  
Economic Development and Environmental Sustainability: New Policy Options

References

External links
Initiative for Policy Dialogue

Non-profit organizations based in New York (state)
Political and economic think tanks in the United States
Development economics